Adamstown railway station is located on the Main Northern line in New South Wales, Australia. It serves the southern Newcastle suburb of Adamstown, and was opened on 15 August 1887.

As part of the electrification of the line in the early 1980s, new station buildings were built, the western relief line and Platform 3 removed, and the 1939 built signal box on Platform 1 that used to control movements to the Belmont line decommissioned on 4 December 1983. Until December 1991, the Belmont line diverged to the south-east of the station.

The station was upgraded with new lifts and footbridge with work completed by late 2017.

In 2019, Platform 1 was extended to accommodate 10-cars.

Platforms and services
Adamstown has two platforms plus a third disused. It is serviced by NSW TrainLink Central Coast & Newcastle Line services travelling from Sydney Central to Newcastle.

Track layout

Transport links
Newcastle Transport operates one route via Adamstown station:
14 Newcastle to Swansea Heads via Kotara, Charlestown and Belmont<ref>

References

External links

Adamstown station details Transport for New South Wales

Easy Access railway stations in New South Wales
Railway stations in the Hunter Region
Railway stations in Australia opened in 1887
Regional railway stations in New South Wales
Short-platform railway stations in New South Wales, 4 cars
Main North railway line, New South Wales